Geoffrey Turner (16 May 1907 – 2 May 1932) was a British athlete. He competed in the men's high jump at the 1928 Summer Olympics. Turner also competed in the 1930 British Empire Games, finishing 6th in the high jump. He died of sepsis in 1932.

References

1907 births
1932 deaths
Athletes (track and field) at the 1928 Summer Olympics
British male high jumpers
Olympic athletes of Great Britain
Place of birth missing